The Cloud is a 1985 oil painting by the Norwegian artist Odd Nerdrum. It depicts a nude man in a leather helmet, looking out over a landscape with a compact dark cloud in the sky.

In 2005 the painting was selected by the newspaper Morgenbladet as one of Norway's twelve most important artworks from the period 1945–2005.

A version of the painting was sold for 1.9 million Norwegian kroner in 2008, which was the new record for a Nerdrum painting. The record was held until 2016 when Dawn was sold for 341,000 British pounds.

Status
The original version is severely damaged because it was painted with an oil mix that turned out to be sensitive to heat. The damaged painting was shown as part of Nerdrum's 2011 tax case, when the Norwegian tax agency deemed that Nerdrum had evaded taxes during the years 1997–2002 by hiding earnings in an Austrian safe deposit box. Nerdrum's defence said that the money was kept so it could be repaid to buyers of potentially damaged paintings from the same period as The Cloud, and that the secrecy was maintained to avoid a general devaluation of Nerdrum's art.

References

1985 paintings
Paintings by Odd Nerdrum